Chen Lanbin (1816–1895), courtesy name Li Qiu, was the first Chinese Ambassador to the United States during the Qing dynasty.

Born in Wuchuan City, Guangdong, he passed the Chinese imperial examination in 1853 at the age of 24, and entered the Hanlin Academy. He soon became the head of two departments of the Qing government in successio, and in 1872 he was sent to the United States and named commissioner of the Chinese Educational Commission in Hartford, Connecticut, despite knowing no English. He occupied numerous other positions until 1875, when he began acting as the government's representative in the United States. He was formally named the Chinese Ambassador to the United States, Spain, and Peru in 1878, a position that he held until 1881. A conservative, Chen was often at odds with the progressive oriented Yung Wing, the first Chinese student to graduate from an American university, and a colleague of his.

In 2015, Chen was featured in an article by China Daily, which remembered his efforts in promoting Sino-US relations.

References

1816 births
1895 deaths
Qing dynasty diplomats
Ambassadors of China to the United States
Qing dynasty politicians from Guangdong
Politicians from Zhanjiang
Ministers of Zongli Yamen